Victoria Pile, also known as Vicky Pile, is a British comedy writer, director and producer, most noted as the creator of two Channel 4 comedy programmes, the sketch show Smack the Pony and the sitcom Green Wing. She began her career writing for Not the Nine O'Clock News whilst still a student at University of Sussex. She has also written for Spitting Image and CBBC.

Writer 

 Not the Nine O'Clock News (1979–82)
 Dear Heart (1982–83)
 Karen Kay (1983–86)
 Pushing Up Daisies, later Coming Next... (1984–85)
 Lazarus and Dingwall (1991)
 You Gotta Be Jokin''' (1991)
 Los Dos Bros (1999–2001)
 Smack the Pony (1999–2003)
 Green Wing (2004–2007)
 Campus (2009-2011)

She has also written a pilot for ABC, set in a police precinct in America. British Sitcom Guide states that "it isn't often that British writers deliberately pitch a series to the American market first".

 Producer / director 
 Los Dos Bros (1999–2001)
 Smack the Pony (1999–2003)
 Green Wing (2004–2007)
 Campus (2009-2011)
 The Delivery Man'' (2015)

References

External links 

British comedy writers
English television producers
British women television producers
British television producers
English television directors
Living people
Year of birth missing (living people)
British women television directors